The 2019–21 Regionalliga Bayern is the eighth season of the Regionalliga Bayern.

The season was originally scheduled as the 2019–20 season. After the Bavarian Football Association (BFV) cancelled the 2020–21 season, which would have been the ninth for this Regionalliga, and enrolled Türkgücü München for the 2020–21 3. Liga, the ongoing season had to resume without Türkgücü in September 2020 and conclude in mid-2021.

Originally, 18 teams from Bavaria competed in the eighth season of the Regionalliga Bayern. Türkgücü München and TSV Rain am Lech were promoted from the 2018–19 Bayernliga Süd and TSV Aubstadt was promoted from the 2018–19 Bayernliga Nord. After Türkgücü München was promoted to the 3. Liga, 17 teams continued competing.

The season was abandoned on 18 May 2021.

Effects of the COVID-19 pandemic
Due to the COVID-19 pandemic in Germany, the BFV announced the postponement of the scheduled Regionalliga matchdays on 14 March 2020.

The Regionalliga Bayern clubs voted on 4 June 2020 to extend their league season beyond September, which meant the BFV had to cancel the 2020–21 season and continue without Türkgücü München, which the BFV registered for promotion to the 3. Liga. Thus, Bavaria is to be represented by a team that wins a play-off series, to be held in the spring of 2021, among the top four teams at the end of the resumed Regionalliga Bayern season. They will have already submitted applications for 3. Liga licences. The Bavarian play-off winners are to face the Regionalliga Nord champions for a place in the 2021–22 3. Liga. The rest of the season was abandoned on 18 May 2021. VfR Garching was relegated based on points per game, while the relegation play-offs were cancelled.

League table

Before season break

After season break
After Türkgücü München was promoted to the 2020–21 3. Liga, they were removed from the league table and all their results were expunged.

Championship play-offs
The top four eligible teams were originally supposed to play a best-of-five knockout tournament to determine the participant in the promotion play-offs against the champions of the 2020–21 Regionalliga Nord. However, on 28 April 2021 it was decided that the top three eligible teams Viktoria Aschaffenburg, SpVgg Bayreuth and 1. FC Schweinfurt will play in a double round-robin group to determine the promotion play-off participant.

Season statistics

Top scorers

References

External links
 Regionalliga Bayern   bfv.de

4B
4B
2019–20 in European fourth tier association football leagues
2020–21 in European fourth tier association football leagues
Association football events postponed due to the COVID-19 pandemic
Association football events curtailed due to the COVID-19 pandemic